The 2016 Delhi Dynamos FC season was club's third season since its establishment in 2014 and also their third season in the Indian Super League.

Background

After the end of the 2014 ISL season, Delhi Dynamos parted ways with their inaugural season head coach, Harm van Veldhoven. Soon after, Roberto Carlos, was named as the new head coach for the 2015 season. The season began for Delhi Dynamos with a 2–0 loss to the Goa on 4 October. The team ended the season with six wins through fourteen matches and qualified for the finals. In the finals, the Delhi Dynamos took on Goa. In the home-leg, the Dynamos won 1–0 with Robin Singh scoring the winner. However, in the away second-leg, the Dynamos lost 3–0 and were thus knocked-out of the ISL finals 3–1 aggregate.

Player movement

Retained players

Foreign players

Domestic

Signings

Indian Super League

Player statistics

See also
 2016–17 in Indian football

References

Delhi
Odisha FC seasons